Planodema parascorta is a species of beetle in the family Cerambycidae. It was described by Veiga Ferreira in 1971.

References

Theocridini
Beetles described in 1971